Karen Middleton may refer to:

Karen Middleton (journalist), political journalist in Australia
Karen Middleton (politician) (born 1966), legislator in the U.S. state of Colorado
Karen Middleton (basketball), American basketball coach